Bill Todhunter (born October 10, 1959, in Cranbrook, British Columbia, Canada) is an American curler and curling coach from Fort Lauderdale, Florida.

Teams

Record as a coach of national teams

Private life
Bill Todhunter resides in Fort Lauderdale, Florida. Outside of curling he works as Regional sales manager for Beghelli. Before moving to Florida, he lived in Menasha, Wisconsin.

He started curling in 1974, when he was 19 years old.

References

External links
 
 
 U.S. curling coach chills in South Florida - Sun Sentinel

Living people
1959 births
Sportspeople from Cranbrook, British Columbia
American male curlers
American curling coaches
American curling champions
Continental Cup of Curling participants
Canadian emigrants to the United States
Sportspeople from Fort Lauderdale, Florida
People from Menasha, Wisconsin
Sportspeople from Wisconsin